"Fast Car" is a song by American singer-songwriter Tracy Chapman. It was released on April 6, 1988, as the lead single from her 1988 self-titled debut studio album. Chapman's appearance on the Nelson Mandela 70th Birthday Tribute helped the song become a top-ten hit in the United States, reaching number six on the Billboard Hot 100. In the United Kingdom, it initially reached number five on the UK Singles Chart in 1988; it would later reach number four in 2011 after Michael Collings performed it on Britain's Got Talent.

"Fast Car" received three Grammy Award nominations: Record of the Year,  Song of the Year, and Best Female Pop Vocal Performance, the latter of which it won. It also received a MTV Video Music Award nomination for Best Female Video in 1989.

Music and lyrics
According to Metro Weekly critic Chris Gerard, "Fast Car" tells a grittily realistic story of a working poor woman trying to escape the cycle of poverty, set to folk rock music. The song's arrangement was described by Orlando Sentinel writer Thom Duffy as "subtle folk-rock", while Billboard magazine's Gary Trust deemed the record a "folk/pop" song. Dave Marsh said it was perhaps an "optimistic folk-rock narrative", whose characters are in a homeless shelter.

Release and promotion
Elektra Records released "Fast Car" on April 6, 1988, one day after the parent album, Tracy Chapman. That June, Chapman appeared at the Nelson Mandela 70th Birthday Tribute concert, where she was initially scheduled to sing three songs. Just before surprise guest Stevie Wonder walked onstage, he learned that his keyboard's hard disk had gone missing. He left in a panic, forcing the event organizers to usher Chapman back to the stage with nothing but a microphone and her guitar. As the organizers readied the stage for the following act, Chapman performed "Fast Car" and "Across the Lines". This performance brought attention to Chapman's music, with sales for Tracy Chapman increasing greatly, enough for it to top the Billboard 200 chart on August 27, 1988. "Fast Car" itself would reach number six on the Billboard Hot 100 the same week.

Critical reception
Rolling Stone ranked "Fast Car" number 167 on their list of the 500 Greatest Songs of All Time. It is Chapman's only song on the list, and the highest-ranking song performed and solely written by a female artist. When Rolling Stone updated the list in 2021, "Fast Car" was promoted to the 71st spot. Pitchfork named it the 86th-best song of the 1980s.

Renewed British success
In April 2011, "Fast Car" entered the UK top ten for the second time at number four after Michael Collings performed it on Britain's Got Talent, one position higher than its initial chart success in 1988. The single was certified triple platinum in the United Kingdom by the British Phonographic Industry (BPI) in 2022, based on downloads and streaming. By 2016, it had sold 661,500 copies in the United Kingdom.

Charts and certifications

Weekly charts

Year-end charts

Certifications

Tobtok version

In 2015, a tropical house version was released by Swedish record producer Tobtok, featuring vocals from British singer River. Tobtok also released an accompanying music video. Although the Jonas Blue version released shortly after was far more successful, Tobtok's version also charted in a number of charts, notably Australia, where it received significant airplay (some stations like 2Day FM played it over the Jonas Blue version) and reached number 19 on the ARIA Singles Chart in January 2016, while Jonas Blue's version was at number 2. The Tobtok version also charted in the Norwegian VG-lista, Irish IRMA and Danish Tracklisten official charts.

Track listing
"Fast Car" – 3:27
"Fast Car" (L'Tric Remix Radio Edit) – 2:57

Charts

Certifications

Jonas Blue version

In 2015, a tropical house cover of "Fast Car" was released by British record producer Jonas Blue. It is Blue's debut single and features the vocals from British singer Dakota. It is the lead single of Blue's debut album Blue (2018). The Club Mix was included on Blue's compilation, Jonas Blue: Electronic Nature – The Mix 2017.

Background and inspiration
In an interview with iHeartRadio, Blue stated Chapman's original 1988 hit is a favorite of Blue's mother's, who would often play it in the car. "It was a good song in London [during] that time when I was growing up, so it was always on the radio," he went on to say. "And it just kind of stuck with me. It was that song on the long journeys, and I loved it."

Regarding Dakota, who provides vocals on the song, Blue said, "... she [said], 'Oh, I've never done dance music before or anything like that so, I'm not kind of sure.' And I was like, 'Listen, you'd be great.' And she came the next day to record it, and what you hear on the radio is her coming in the next day after her show to record it." Blue also admitted that he wanted to create a Swedish-esque sound on the record: "I think with things like the synth lead lines in it, giving it that second hook, I was kind of going for a very kind of Swedish-y kind of sound. That's kind of the influence behind that kind of lead synth line, and that was something which I don't think people have picked up on yet, but they just like the song because of what it is."

Chart performance
The Jonas Blue version peaked at number two on the UK Singles Chart, behind Zayn Malik's "Pillowtalk". Its UK peak meant it charted higher than Chapman's original, which peaked at number five on the chart in May 1988 and a position higher upon a re-release in April 2011.

Outside the United Kingdom, the Jonas Blue version reached number one in Australia. and Hungary, whilst also peaking within the top ten in Germany, Ireland, Italy, the Netherlands, Belgium, New Zealand and Sweden. In the United States, the Jonas Blue version went to number one on the Dance Club Songs chart.

It reached 1 billion streams on Spotify in late February 2023.

Track listing

Charts and certifications

Weekly charts

Year-end charts

Certifications

Other cover versions

The song has been covered many times, and it was parodied as "I Write a Fast Song" in the In Living Color sketch "Making of a Tracy Chapman Song", in which Chapman (portrayed by Kim Wayans) writes a song by looking out her window and witnessing events such as an old man getting hit by a bus and a domestic dispute.

David Usher covered the song on his 2001 album Morning Orbit.

Xiu Xiu covered the song in 2003, for their second album A Promise. 

In September 2014, Sam Smith covered the song on BBC Radio 1's Live Lounge, as did British singer Birdy in April 2016, Khalid in March 2018, and Justin Bieber in September 2018. In 2021, pop punk band Unwell released a cover of the song.

See also
 List of number-one singles of 2016 (Australia)
 List of number-one dance singles of 2016 (U.S.)

References

External links
 Official music video on YouTube

1988 songs
1988 debut singles
Tracy Chapman songs
The Wilkinsons songs
Dutch Top 40 number-one singles
Folk ballads
RPM Top Singles number-one singles
Irish Singles Chart number-one singles
Ultratop 50 Singles (Flanders) number-one singles
Songs written by Tracy Chapman
Elektra Records singles
Capitol Records singles
Positiva Records singles
Virgin EMI Records singles
Song recordings produced by David Kershenbaum
Songs about poverty
Number-one singles in Australia
Number-one singles in Hungary
Number-one singles in Portugal
Number-one singles in Scotland
2015 debut singles
2016 singles
Songs about cars
Songs about parenthood
Songs about alcohol
Tropical house songs
Jonas Blue songs
Grammy Award for Best Female Pop Vocal Performance
1980s ballads